Kuttalam Palace (or Courtallam Palace) is a palace situated in the Courtallam village of Tenkasi district (Old Thirunelveli District), Tamil Nadu, India. It is one of the important palace of the Travancore province. It is owned, controlled and maintained by Kerala Archaeology Department. It is located in the foothills of Western Ghats and in the middle of Courtallam. It was built by Vishakam Thirunal in 1882. The palace and guesthouse consist of 56.6 acres. Courtallam falls are the important destination nearby.

Before 1956, these areas are under the control of Travancore-Cochin state. These Courtallam and Shenkottai was a part of Shenkottai taluk of Kollam district, Travancore state including Aryankavu village. In 1956, Aryankavu panchayath was transferred to the Kerala state and rest of Shenkottai taluk transferred to Madras state.

External links

Palaces in Tamil Nadu